The Complete Peerage (full title: The Complete Peerage of  England, Scotland, Ireland, Great Britain, and the United Kingdom Extant, Extinct, or Dormant; first edition by George Edward Cokayne, Clarenceux King of Arms; 2nd edition revised by Vicary Gibbs et al.) is a comprehensive and magisterial work on the titled aristocracy of the British Isles.

History
The Complete Peerage was first published in eight volumes between 1887 and 1898 by George Edward Cokayne (G. E. C.).

This version was effectively replaced by a new and enlarged edition between 1910 and 1959, edited successively by Vicary Gibbs (Cokayne's nephew), H. A. Doubleday, Duncan Warrand, Lord Howard de Walden, Geoffrey H. White and R. S. Lea. The revised edition, published by the St Catherine Press Limited, was in twelve volumes, with volume twelve issued in two parts. 

Volume thirteen was issued in 1940, not as part of the alphabetical sequence, but as a supplement covering creations and promotions within the peerage between 1900 and 1938. The leading researcher on the project was Ethel Stokes and the five volumes from 1929 to 1949 acknowledge her major contribution.

The work has been reprinted in a number of formats, most notably by Alan Sutton Publishers who reduced it in size to six volumes in a photographically reduced format. This contains four page images on each smaller page.

It was available on CD. A further reprint in six volumes appeared in 2000, together with Volume 14, which is an appendix, correcting the original publication (1910–1938) and briefly updating it to 1995.

Volumes

1st edition

All volumes edited by George Cokayne.

2nd edition

Volumes 1–5 have the title Complete peerage of England, Scotland, Ireland, Great Britain and the United Kingdom, extant, extinct or dormant, and volumes 6–13: The complete peerage; or, A history of the House of lords and all its members from the earliest times.

See also 

 Burke's Peerage

References

External links

1st edition

 1) 
 2) 
 3) 
 4) 
 5) 
 6) 
 7) 
 8)

2nd edition 

 1) 
 2) 
 3) 
 4) 
 5) 
 6) 
 7)  
 8)  
 9)  
 10) 
 11) 
 12.1) 
 12.2) 
 13) 
 14)

External links
 Complete Peerage
Parliamentary Archives, The Complete Peerage Trust

1887 non-fiction books
19th-century history books
George Bell & Sons books
History books about England
History books about Scotland
History books about Ireland
History books about the United Kingdom
English society
Genealogy publications
British biographical dictionaries
Irish genealogy
Peerages in the United Kingdom